Year 1073 (MLXXIII) was a common year starting on Tuesday (link will display the full calendar) of the Julian calendar.

Events 
 By place 

 Byzantine Empire 
 Spring – Emperor Michael VII (Doukas) sends a Byzantine army to deal with Seljuk raiding in Cappadocia, supported with a mixed force of Norman and French mercenary heavy cavalry under Roussel de Bailleul. Roussel re-conquers some territory in Galatia and declares it an independent Norman state. Michael, enraged, sends another army led by his uncle, Caesar John Doukas and the veteran General Nikephoros Botaneiates to deal with the rising of the Norman threat in Asia minor. But the Byzantines are defeated and John is captured. Roussel marches with a force (3,000 men) across Bithynia to the Bosporus and sacks Chrysopolis, near Constantinople.

 Europe 
 May 25 – King Sancho IV of Navarre and Ahmad al-Muqtadir, Muslim ruler of the Taifa of Zaragoza, conclude an alliance by treaty.
 Ebles II of Roucy leads a French army in Spain, to support King Sancho V of Aragon in his struggle against his Muslim neighbors.
 Sviatoslav II and Vsevolod I unite the Kievan forces and expel their brother Iziaslav I. Sviatoslav II becomes Grand Prince of Kiev.
 October 14 – The Judicate of Arborea (one of the four independent kingdoms in Sardinia) is recognised by Pope Gregory VII.

 England 
 Edgar Ætheling, last male member of the House of Wessex, joins forces with King Malcolm III of Scotland and King Philip I (the Amorous) of France in an attempt to take the English throne.

 Asia 
 Wang Anshi, Chinese chief chancellor of the Song Dynasty, creates a new bureau of the central government (called the Directorate of Weapons), which supervises the manufacture of military armaments and ensures quality control.
 June 15 – Emperor Go-Sanjō dies after a 5-year reign and is succeeded by his 19-year-old son Shirakawa as the 72nd emperor of Japan.

 By topic 

 Religion 
 April 21 – Pope Alexander II dies after a 11½-year pontificate at Rome. He is succeeded by Gregory VII as the 157th pope of the Catholic Church.
 Rabbi Yitchaki Alfassi finishes writing the Rif, an important work of Jewish law.
 John IX bar Shushan ends his term as Syriac Orthodox Patriarch of Antioch.

Births 
 Agnes of Waiblingen, daughter of Henry IV (or 1072)
 Alfonso I (the Battler), king of Aragon (approximate date)
 Al-Tighnari, Moorish botanist and physician (d. 1118)
 Anastatius IV, pope of the Catholic Church (d. 1154)
 David IV (the Builder), king of Georgia (d. 1125)
 Leopold III (the Good), margrave of Austria (d. 1136)
 Magnus III (Barefoot), king of Norway (d. 1103)
 Meng, empress of the Song Dynasty (d. 1131)
 Philippa, French noblewoman (approximate date)
 Shaykh Tabarsi, Persian Shia scholar (d. 1153)
 Thomas of Marle, lord of Coucy (d. 1130)
 Zbigniew, duke of Poland (approximate date)
 Lady Six Monkey, queen regnant of the Mixtec city State of Huachino (d. 1100)

Deaths 
 April 21 – Alexander II, pope of the Catholic Church
 June 15 – Go-Sanjō, emperor of Japan (b. 1032)
 July 12 – John Gualbert, Italian monk and abbot
 December 20 – Dominic of Silos, Spanish abbot (b. 1000)
 Al-Qushayri, Persian Sufi scholar and theologian (or 1072)
 Anthony of Kiev, Russian monk and saint (b. 983)
 Badis ibn Habus, Berber king of the Taifa of Granada
 Barisone I of Torres, Sardinian ruler (judge) of Arborea
 Bleddyn ap Cynfyn, king of Gwynedd (approximate date)
 Peter Damian, cardinal-bishop of Ostia (or 1072)
 Zhou Dunyi, Chinese philosopher and cosmologist (b. 1017)

References